This is the discography for American jazz band leader Sammy Kaye.

Albums 
 All Ashore—vocals: Tommy Ryan (9-19-1938)
 Along the Santa Fe Trail—vocals: Jimmy Brown (11-12-1940)
 Chickery Chick—vocals: Nancy Norman and Billy Williams (11-8-1945)
 Christmas Day with Sammy Kaye—Decca DL 74070 (1960)
 Come Dance to the Hits—Decca DL 74502 (1964)
 Daddy—vocals: Choir (3-31-1941)
 Dance to My Golden Favorites—Decca DL 74121
 Dreamy Dancing—Columbia CL-1254 (1959) Mono
 Harbor Lights—Columbia (1950)
 Here You Are—vocals: Elaine Beatty (4-7-1942, Chicago)
 I Left My Heart at the Stagedoor Canteen—vocals: Don Cornell (6-5-1942)
 I Married an Angel—vocals: Jimmy Brown (5-19-1938)
 I Want to Wish You a Merry Christmas—Columbia CL 1035 (1957)
 In Our Little Part of Town—vocals: Clyde Burke (12-5-1939, NY)
 Josephine (8-25-1937, NY)
 Let There Be Love—vocals: Tommy Ryan (3-20-1940, NY)
 Minka—vocals: Tommy Ryan (6-18-1944)
 Music Maestro Please—Columbia CL-668 (1956)
 My Buddy—vocals: Tommy Ryan (12-30-1941)
 Penny Serenade—vocals: Jimmy Brown (1-20-1939, NY)
 Remember Pearl Harbor—vocals: Glee Club (12-17-1941)
 Rosalie—vocals: Tommy Ryan (7-7-1937, NY)
 Sammy Kaye Plays Swing & Sway for Your Dancing Pleasure—Decca DL 74306 (19??)
 Serenade of the Bells—Columbia CL 1173 (1958)
 "Sing and Sway with Sammy Kaye and his Orchestra" (Decca Records, date unknown)
 Songs I Wish I Had Played...The First Time Around—Decca DL 74154 (19??)
 Star Dust (5-27-1938, NY)
 The Shrine of St. Cecelia—vocals: Don Cornell (10-23-1941)
 The White Cliffs of Dover—vocals: Arthur Wright (11-11-1941)
 True Confession—vocals: Charlie Wilson (10-27-1937)
 Two Hearts That Pass in the Night—vocals: Arthur Wright (3-31-1941)
 Until Tomorrow (Goodnight, My Love)—vocals: The Three Kaydettes (12-23-1940, NY)
 What Makes Sammy Swing & Sway—Columbia CL 891 (1956)
 White Sails (Beneath a Yellow Moon)—vocals: Clyde Burk (5-17-1939, NY)
 Wonder When My Baby's Coming Home—vocals: Nancy Norman (6-5-1942, NY)

Songs

References

Discographies of American artists
Jazz discographies